Adenauerplatz is a Berlin U-Bahn Station on the U7 line in the district of Charlottenburg, borough of Charlottenburg-Wilmersdorf. It was opened on 28 April 1978 after the north-west extension to Spandau, and is located on the Kurfürstendamm/Lewishamstraße intersection.

As of 1 February 2019, a lift has been installed at the station, making it accessible.

History 

The development of the area around the present Adenauerplatz was planned in 1913. The Kurfuerstendamm line (later U3, today U1) was to cross further westwards from the Uhlandstraße station, the present-day terminus, and terminate at Theodor-Heuss-Platz station. These plans were not initially put into action, meaning that the station was not built until the U7 line was extended in the 1970s. To accommodate the western extension of the U3, which was still in the planning stage, a second platform was built underneath the U7.

In 2004, the underground station underwent complete renovation. The supports and the ceiling were fitted with a lighter trim along with granite tiles for the floor. The architect Rainer G. Ruemmler originally designed the station, however during the renovation many of the station's original features were removed.

In 2016, it was proposed to construct an elevator to make the station barrier-free. Construction started in 2018, and it was put into operation on 1 February 2019.

Transport links 
At this station it is possible to transfer to bus lines X10, M19, M29, 109, 110 and 310 of the Berlin Transport Authority.

References

http://pardok.parlament-berlin.de/starweb/adis/citat/VT/17/KlAnfr/ka17-11609.pdf

U7 (Berlin U-Bahn) stations
Buildings and structures in Charlottenburg-Wilmersdorf
Railway stations in Germany opened in 1978
1978 establishments in West Germany